House of Cards is an American political drama television series created by Beau Willimon for Netflix. The first season, based on the BBC miniseries of the same name and the series of books by Michael Dobbs, premiered exclusively via Netflix's web streaming service on February 1, 2013. 

Kevin Spacey stars as Representative Francis Underwood, the Majority Whip, who, after being passed up for the position of Secretary of State, initiates an elaborate plan to get himself into a position of greater power, aided by his wife, Claire Underwood (Robin Wright). Spacey was not featured in the sixth and final season, as he was fired from the show due to sexual misconduct allegations.

Series overview

Episodes

Season 1 (2013)

Season 2 (2014)

Season 3 (2015)

Season 4 (2016)

Season 5 (2017)

Season 6 (2018)

References

External links 

 
Lists of American drama television series episodes